Patir can refer to:

People
Rajani Kanta Patir (1917–?), Indian Administrative Service officer
Sumitra Patir Indian politician

Food
Pastil, a Filipino packed rice dish